Browns Lake is a lake in the U.S. state of Washington.

Browns Lake derives its name from Henry Brown, a pioneer settler.

References

Lakes of Stevens County, Washington
Lakes of Washington (state)